Pas Chic Chic were a Canadian indie pop group, whose album Au Contraire was a longlisted nominee for the 2008 Polaris Music Prize. A side project led by Roger Tellier-Craig of Godspeed You! Black Emperor and Fly Pan Am, the band's music was a psychedelic spin on francophone musical traditions such as yé-yé and chansonnier pop.

The band featured Tellier-Craig and Marie-Douce St-Jacques on vocals, along with guitarist Radwan Moumneh, bassist Éric Gingras and drummer Éric Fillion. The album was released in April 2008 on Semprini Records.

References

Canadian indie pop groups
Musical groups from Montreal
Canadian psychedelic rock music groups